The West Fourth Street Courts, also known as "The Cage", are a notable public athletic venue for amateur basketball in the Greenwich Village neighborhood of Manhattan in New York City.  "The Cage" has become one of the most important tournament sites for the citywide "Streetball" amateur basketball tournament, and is noted for its non-regulation size.

Because it is so small, more emphasis is given to "banging inside," or tough physical play. Usually the sidelines are simply ignored during play. Due to the large number of players who come to play here, competition for playing time is stiff, and losing players rarely get to play twice.

The courts are located over the New York City Subway's West Fourth Street–Washington Square station, whose entrance is adjacent to the courts.

Media
Numerous national commercials have been shot at The Cage. Former NBA players Anthony Mason and Smush Parker are some of the nationally recognized players to learn their tough style of play from The Cage. The court is depicted in NBA Street V3 and is a playable court in the game.

References

External links
 Profile in Washington Square News: 
 Profile in The Village Voice: 

Sports venues in Manhattan
Greenwich Village
Basketball venues in New York City
Streetball